Accrington Football Club was an English football club from Accrington, Lancashire, who were one of the founder members of The Football League.

History

Accrington F.C. was formed following a meeting at a local public house in 1876. The Owd Reds played at Accrington Cricket Club's ground in Thorneyholme Road, still in use for that sport today.

The club was part of the revolt against the Football Association in 1884 over professionalism, after being expelled from the FA the previous year for paying a player. They were one of the original twelve teams forming the Football League on 17 April 1888.  Accrington's best season was in 1889–90, when they finished sixth in the table. However, in the 1892–93 season the team finished fifteenth (of 16) and was relegated after losing a test match 1–0 against Sheffield United at Trent Bridge.  Accrington then resigned from the league rather than play in the Second Division, becoming the first of the founding Football League clubs to leave the League permanently (Stoke had failed re-election in 1890, but rejoined the league a year later).

After its first season in the Lancashire League, Accrington unsuccessfully applied for re-election to the Football League. Shortly afterwards, Accrington F.C. suffered financial problems, which eventually led to its demise. The club continued outside the league until 1896, when it finally folded following a 12–0 defeat on 14 January against Darwen in the Lancashire Senior Cup.

Accrington did not have a Football League team again until in 1921–22 the Lancashire Combination league's Accrington Stanley (formerly a local rival), became a member as part of a major expansion of the league.

League and Cup history

International players
During its short life, the club had three players selected for England:
George Haworth – 5 caps (1887–1890)
Joe Lofthouse – 1 cap (1890)
Jimmy Whitehead – 1 cap (1893)

References

External links
Every match result and League table while in the Football League
Accrington on Football Club History Database

Defunct football clubs in England
Defunct football clubs in Lancashire
Association football clubs established in 1876
Association football clubs disestablished in 1896
1876 establishments in England
1896 disestablishments in England
Sport in Hyndburn
History of Hyndburn
Accrington
The Football League founder members
Defunct English Football League clubs
Lancashire Combination
Lancashire League (football)